Platnickina tincta is a tangle web spider species with Holarctic distribution. It is notably found in Lithuania.

It is the type species in the genus Platnickina. The type locality is Paris, France.

See also 
 List of Theridiidae species

References 

Theridiidae
Holarctic spiders
Spiders of Europe
Spiders described in 1802